Capra may refer to:
 Capra (genus), comprising the goats
 Capra (goat dance), a Romanian custom
 Capra (titular see), a titular see in the Catholic Church
 Capra (car), a pick-up brand from the Iranian Bahman Group

People
 Buzz Capra (born 1947), American baseball player
 Frank Capra (1897–1991), American film director
 Frank Capra Jr. (1934–2007), American studio manager
 Francis Capra (born 1983), American actor
 Fritjof Capra (born 1939), American physicist
 Vinny Capra (born 1996), American baseball player

Fictional characters
 Andrew Capra, one of the suspects in Tess Gerritsen's thriller novel The Surgeon
 Eddie Capra, central character in the television series The Eddie Capra Mysteries

Geography
Rivers in Romania:
 Capra, a tributary of the Ciocadia in Gorj County
 Valea Caprei, a tributary of the Dașor in Bihor County
 Capra, a tributary of the Motrul Sec in Gorj County
 Capra (Bicaz), a tributary of the Bicaz in Neamț County
 Capra Mică, a tributary of the Tărlung in Brașov County

Italian-language surnames